Fountain is an unincorporated community in Mineral County, West Virginia, United States, located at the intersection of West Virginia Route 46 and Knobley Road.

References 

Unincorporated communities in Mineral County, West Virginia
Unincorporated communities in West Virginia